Bocchoris (also known as Bocchorum,  Bocchor and Oppidum Bochoritanum) was an ancient city in northern Majorca (Balearic Islands, Spain), dating back to pre-Roman times. It was one of the oldest settlements in Majorca and was once a foederatus (federated city to Rome), as recorded by Pliny the Elder.

Location 

Bocchoris lay near the current town of Port de Pollença, on a hill to the right of the road from Port de Pollença to Pollença, around Boquer Valley. 

The city dates back to  1400 BC and many traces of it remain. A long stretch of the Roman town wall and the entrance gates are still visible in what is now flat farmland. The surrounding area has not been excavated.

Historiography 

The civitas bocchoritana, i.e., Bocchoris, is unique in the island of Majorca. Evidence that it once was a federated city is sensu stricto confirmed by juridic epigraphy, in the form of two different tabulae patronatus. Pliny the Elder also listed Bocchoris among the federated cities, in his book Naturalis Historia, III, 77–78 in the 1st century BC:

The Baleares, so formidable in war with their slingers, have received from the Greeks the name of Gymnasiæ. The larger island is 100 miles in length, and 475 in circumference. It has the following towns; Palma and Pollentia, enjoying the rights of Roman citizens, Cinium and Tucis, with Latin rights; and Bocchorum was a federate town.

Near the ruins of Bocchoris, two bronze inscriptions were found, dating back to the years 10 BC and 6 AD. One inscription, found in the Bay of Pollença in 1951, and dating to 10 BC, mainly stated that Bocchoris' patron was Marcus Crassus, Roman consul in 14 BC. The whole text in Latin, as written in the inscription, is as follows:

(Iullo Ant)onio Fabio Africano | a(nte) d(iem) XVII k(alendas) Apriles | Civitas Bochoritana ex | insula Baliarum Maiorum | patronum cooptavit M. | Crassum Frugi leiberos | posterosque eius. | M. Crassus Frugi eos in | suam suorumque | clientelam recepit. Egerunt C. Coelius C. F. et | C. Caecilius T. F. legati

The other tabula patronatus was discovered much earlier, in 1765. According to this bronze inscription, dating to 6 AD, the Senate and the people of Bocchoris selected by mutual consent the Roman Senator Marcus Atilius Vernus as their patron. In Latin, it says:

M. Aemilio Lepido, L. Arruntio | co(n)s(ulibus) k(alendis) Mais. | Ex insula Baliarum Maiore senatus | populusque Bocchoritanus M. Atilium M. F. Gal(eria) Vernum patronum coopata|verunt | M. Atilius M. F. Gal(eria) Vernus senatum | populusque Bochoritanum in fidem | clientelamque suam suorumque recepit. | Egerunt Q. Caecilius Quintus | C. Valerius Icesta praetores

Etymology 

Very little is known about the origin of the word Bocchoris and whether the name of the city was actually Bocchor, Bocchoris or Bocchorum. The name is still conserved in its Catalan variant, Boquer, which denominates the area around the current Boquer valley in Port de Pollença.

References

Indigenous ancient cities in Spain
Former populated places in Spain
Archaeological sites in Spain
Ruins in Spain
History of Mallorca